Samuel Henry Cartledge (1882 – 16 January 1938) was an English professional footballer who played as a goalkeeper.

References

1882 births
1938 deaths
English footballers
Association football goalkeepers
Grimsby St John's F.C. players
Grimsby Town F.C. players
Queens Park Rangers F.C. players
Worksop Town F.C. players
Grimsby Rangers F.C. players
English Football League players